Marcel Bouyer (1 July 1920 – 9 August 2000) was a French politician. He served as a member of the National Assembly from 1956 to 1958, representing Charente-Maritime.

Early life
Marcel Bouyer was born on 1 July 1920 in Royan, France.

Career
Bouyer worked as a pastry chef in Royan. He volunteered to serve in the French Army during World War II.

Bouyer joined the Union for the Defense of Tradesmen and Artisans. He served as a member of the National Assembly from 1956 to 1958, representing Charente-Maritime. He was a proponent of French Algeria.

Death
Bouyer died on 9 August 2000 in Vaux-sur-Mer, France.

References

1920 births
2000 deaths
People from Royan
Politicians from Nouvelle-Aquitaine
Union for the Defense of Tradesmen and Artisans politicians
Deputies of the 3rd National Assembly of the French Fourth Republic
French Army personnel of World War II